The Daventry District was from 1974 to 2021 a local government district in western Northamptonshire, England. The district was named after its main town of Daventry where the council was based.

The district was created on 1 April 1974, under the Local Government Act 1972, by a merger of the historic municipal borough of Daventry with the Daventry Rural District and most of the Brixworth Rural District. The town of Daventry became an unparished area with Charter Trustees and remained so until 2003 when a civil parish was created, roughly corresponding with the boundaries of the former borough, so allowing Daventry to have its own town council.

At the 2011 Census, the district had a population of 77,843, a little under a third of whom (25,026) lived in the town of Daventry. Other significant settlements included Brixworth, Long Buckby and Weedon Bec. The rest of the district was predominantly rural.

Abolition and replacement
In March 2018, following suspension of the County Council arising from its becoming insolvent, due to financial and cultural mismanagement by the cabinet and officers, the then Secretary of State for Local Government, Sajid Javid, sent commissioner Max Caller into the council, who recommended the county council and all district and borough councils in the county be abolished, and replaced by two unitary authorities, one covering the West, and one the North of the county. These proposals were approved in April 2019. It meant that the districts of Daventry, Northampton and South Northamptonshire were merged to form a new unitary authority called West Northamptonshire, whilst the second unitary authority North Northamptonshire consists of Corby, East Northamptonshire, Kettering and Wellingborough districts. These new authorities came into being on 1 April 2021. Elections for the new authorities were due to be held on 7 May 2020, but were delayed due to the COVID-19 pandemic. These elections were later held on 6 May 2021.

Demography

Ethnicity

Settlements

 Althorp, Arthingworth, Ashby St Ledgers
 Badby, Barby, Boughton, Braunston, Brington, Brixworth, Brockhall, Byfield
 Canons Ashby, Chapel Brampton, Charwelton, Church Brampton, Church Stowe, Clay Coton  Clipston, Cold Ashby, Coton, Cottesbrooke, Creaton, Crick
 Daventry, Dodford, Draughton
 East Farndon, East Haddon, Elkington, Everdon
 Farthingstone, Fawsley, Flore
 Great Brington, Great Oxendon, Guilsborough
 Hanging Houghton, Hannington, Harlestone, Haselbech, Hellidon, Holcot, Holdenby, Hollowell
 Kelmarsh, Kilsby
 Lamport, Lilbourne, Little Brington, Long Buckby, Lower Catesby
 Maidwell, Marston Trussell, Moulton
 Naseby, Newnham, Norton
 Old, Overstone
 Pitsford, Preston Capes
 Ravensthorpe
 Scaldwell, Sibbertoft, Spratton, Stanford-on-Avon, Staverton, Sulby
 Teeton, Thornby
 Upper Catesby, Upper Stowe
 Walgrave, Watford, Weedon Bec, Welford, Welton, West Haddon, Whilton, Winwick, Woodford Halse
 Yelvertoft

Political control

See Daventry District Council elections

See also

 Grade I listed buildings in Daventry District
 Grade II* listed buildings in Daventry District

References

 
Former non-metropolitan districts
Non-metropolitan districts of Northamptonshire
2021 disestablishments in England
West Northamptonshire District